Georg, Duke of Hohenberg (25 April 1929 – 25 July 2019), was, at the time of his death, the senior agnate of the House of Habsburg-Lorraine.

Life
Georg was born at Artstetten Castle in the community of Artstetten-Pöbring, Lower Austria, on 25 April 1929.  He was the second son of Maximilian, Duke of Hohenberg and Countess Elisabeth von Waldburg zu Wolfegg und Waldsee.

Following the collapse of the monarchy, all Austrian titles were abolished by law in 1919. From then on, names consisted only of forename and surname, without von or titles, scilicet Georg Hohenberg.

On 16 August 1977, upon the death of his elder brother, Franz, Duke of Hohenberg, Georg became Head of the House of Hohenberg. Georg Hohenberg was a diplomat and was appointed Ambassador of the Republic of Austria to several countries, with his last appointment being to the Holy See during the pontificate of Pope John Paul II.

Duke Georg was a Bailiff Grand Cross of Justice of the Sacred Military Constantinian Order of Saint George.

Georg, Duke of Hohenberg died on 25 July 2019 at the age of 90.

Family 
Duke Georg married civilly on 4 July 1960 in Vienna and religiously on 8 September 1960 at Schloss Wald, Eleonore of Auersperg-Breunner (born 12 September 1928 in Goldegg and died February 2021), daughter of Karl Alain, Prince of Auersperg-Breunner and Countess Marie Henriette of Meran. The couple had three children.

Honours
  Austro-Hungarian Imperial and Royal Family: Knight of the Order of the Golden Fleece
  Two Sicilian Royal Family: Bailiff Knight Grand Cross of Justice of the Two Sicilian Royal Sacred Military Constantinian Order of Saint George

Ancestry

References

|-

Austrian nobility
Hohenberg family
1929 births
Ambassadors of Austria to the Holy See
2019 deaths
Austrian Roman Catholics
Knights of the Golden Fleece of Austria
Austrian diplomats